Fanitesi Niu (born 11 August 2001) is a Tonga international rugby league footballer who plays as a  or  for Dolphins in the National Rugby League.

He previously played for the Brisbane Broncos in the NRL.

Background
Niu was born in Brisbane, Queensland, Australia. He was educated at Marsden State High School and played his junior rugby league for the Forest Lake Magpies. He is the first cousin of David Fifita.

Niu also represented the 2018 Australian Schoolboys.

Playing career

2019
Niu represented Tonga in 2019 Great Britain Lions tour making his international debut. He then played for Tonga 9s in the 2019 Rugby League World Cup 9s.

2020
On 4 June 2020, he made his NRL debut for the Brisbane Broncos, coming off the interchange bench in a record 59-0 home defeat against the Sydney Roosters.

On 27 June 2020, he made his starting debut at fullback against the Gold Coast Titans.

He made a total of six appearances for Brisbane in the 2020 NRL season after suffering a season-ending wrist injury in round 10, as the club finished last on the table and claimed its first-ever wooden spoon.

2021
In round 16 of the 2021 NRL season, Niu scored two tries in a 26-18 victory over Cronulla-Sutherland.

2022
Niu played a total of ten games for Brisbane in the 2022 NRL season scoring three tries as the club finished 9th on the table and missed out on the finals.
In the third group game at the 2021 Rugby League World Cup, Niu scored a hat-trick for Tonga in their 92-10 victory over the Cook Islands at the Riverside Stadium.

2023
On 5 January, Niu signed a one-year deal to join the newly admitted Dolphins team ahead of the 2023 NRL season after he was granted an early release by Brisbane.
In round 3 of the 2023 NRL season, Niu became the first player in the Dolphins NRL history to score a hat-trick as they beat an injury depleted Newcastle side 36-20.

References

External links
Brisbane Broncos profile

2001 births
Living people
Australian sportspeople of Tongan descent
Australian rugby league players
Brisbane Broncos players
Rugby league centres
Rugby league players from Brisbane
Tonga national rugby league team players